Wat Saket Ratcha Wora Maha Wihan (usually shortened to Wat Saket is a Buddhist temple (wat) in Pom Prap Sattru Phai district, Bangkok, Thailand.

The temple dates back to the Ayutthaya era, when it was known as Wat Sakae (วัดสะแก). When Bangkok became the capital, King Rama I (1737–1809) renovated the temple and gave it its present name (which roughly translates as "wash hair"): it was believed that on his return from the war, the king stopped to take a bath and wash his hair here, before entering the inner city.

Phu Khao Thong
Phu Khao Thong (“Golden Mountain”) is a steep artificial hill inside the Wat Saket compound.

Rama I's grandson, King Rama III (1788–1851), decided to build a chedi of huge dimensions inside Wat Saket, but the chedi collapsed during construction because the soft soil of Bangkok could not support the weight. Over the next few decades, the abandoned mud-and-brick structure acquired the shape of a natural hill and was overgrown with weeds. The locals called it the phu khao (ภูเขา), as if it was a natural feature.

During the reign of King Rama IV, construction began of a small chedi on the hill. It was completed early in the reign of his son, King Rama V (1853–1910). A relic of the Buddha was brought from Sri Lanka by Prince Pritsadang and placed in the chedi. The surrounding concrete walls were added in the 1940s to stop the hill from eroding. The modern Wat Saket was built in the early 20th century using Carrara marble.

An annual festival is held at Wat Saket every November, featuring a candlelight procession up Phu Khao Thong to the chedi, which is wrapped in a long red robe (similar to "Hae Pha Khuen That" (แห่ผ้าขึ้นธาตุ) festival of Wat Phra Mahathat, Nakhon Si Thammarat province in southern Thailand. Devotees write their names and the names of family members on the robe and pray, believing that their prayers will be fulfilled. This festival has been observed since the reign of King Rama V.

At the same time, a great Loi Krathong festival takes place at the temple, along with freak shows such as Phi Krasue ("floating female ghost head with glowing viscera dangling below"), Khon Song Hua ("two-headed man"), Mia Ngu ("snake's wife"), or fun games Sao Noi Tok Nam ("little girl falling into water") etc. This festival is well known to Bangkok residents. The nearby Fort Mahakan community was a hub of the fireworks industry; however, after the demolition of the fort and removal of its community, fireworks trading has been banned.  

Phu Khao Thong is now a popular Bangkok tourist attraction and has become a symbol of the city.

Vultures of Wat Saket

In the early Rattanakosin period (between reigns of Rama I and Rama V), the Siamese had a tradition of not cremating the dead within the city walls, because it was believed to be an evil portent. Wat Saket was outside the city walls, so it was often used as a place to cremate dead bodies, which were carried through the Pratu Phi or 'ghost gate'.

In 1820, during the reign of King Rama II (1809–1824), cholera spread from Penang to Bangkok, leading to more than 30,000 deaths in the capital. Wat Saket became the main receiving ground of many dead bodies that were moved in everyday, along with Wat Sangwet in Banglampoo and Wat Choeng Lane in Sampheng. Due to the large number of deaths, the temple was unable to cremate every dead body; some of the bodies were therefore left in the open area of the monastery, and vultures began coming to devour them. The temple became the main food court for vultures, and there were outbreaks of cholera every dry season until the early reign of King Rama V. The severest outbreak was in 1840 during the reign of King Rama III when one in ten people in Siam and the surrounding areas were killed by the disease. The last spreading of the disease took place in 1881, when many hundreds died each day.

The vultures became a grim image and reminder of the deaths, and Raeng Wat Saket (แร้งวัดสระเกศ, 'vultures of Wat Saket') has become a common saying, often paired with Pret Wat Suthat (เปรตวัดสุทัศน์, 'preta of Wat Suthat', probably a reference to legends surrounding the wall murals of that temple).

See also
 History of Bangkok
 Sumeru
 Mandala (Southeast Asian history)
 Wat Si Saket

Notes

References

External links

 A photograph of the chedi under construction c. 1865 by John Thompson

Saket
Tourist attractions in Bangkok
Pom Prap Sattru Phai district
Thai Theravada Buddhist temples and monasteries
Registered ancient monuments in Bangkok